Szymon Pawłowski (born 4 November 1986) is a Polish professional footballer who plays as a midfielder for Polish club Lech Poznań II.

Career

Club
Born in Połczyn Zdrój, Pawłowski made his professional debut in Poland's by appearing against Lech Poznań on March 10, 2007.

On 31 August 2017 he was loaned to Bruk-Bet Termalica Nieciecza.

National team
He made his first appearance for the Poland national football team in a friendly against Bosnia and Herzegovina in December 2007.

Career statistics

Club

1 Including Polish SuperCup.

International goals

Honours

Club
Zagłębie Lubin
 Ekstraklasa: 2006–07
 Polish Super Cup: 2007

Lech Poznań
 Ekstraklasa: 2014–15
 Polish Super Cup: 2015, 2016

References

External links
 
 

1986 births
Living people
People from Połczyn-Zdrój
Sportspeople from West Pomeranian Voivodeship
Polish footballers
Association football midfielders
Zagłębie Lubin players
Lech Poznań players
Lech Poznań II players
Bruk-Bet Termalica Nieciecza players
Zagłębie Sosnowiec players
Ekstraklasa players
I liga players
Poland under-21 international footballers
Poland international footballers